KPMI-FM (94.5 FM, "The River") is a radio station licensed to serve the community of Baudette, Minnesota. The station is owned by Paskvan Media, Inc. It airs a classic rock format.
The station started as a construction permit with 100,000 watts of power, however downgraded to 3,000 watts before signing on. The station could potentially upgrade to 100,000 watts in the future. Paskvan Media owns several stations in Bemidji, Minnesota.

References

External links

Radio stations in Minnesota